Hardang (also Romanized as Hārdang; also known as Hardank and Hārdank) is a village in Zirkuh Rural District, Bagh-e Bahadoran District, Lenjan County, Isfahan Province, Iran. At the 2006 census, its population was 1,774, in 460 families.

References 

Populated places in Lenjan County